Glover's Reef is a partially submerged atoll located off the southern coast of Belize, approximately 45 kilometres from the mainland. It forms part of the outermost boundary of the Belize Barrier Reef, and is one of its three atolls, besides Turneffe Atoll and Lighthouse Reef.

Topography

The interior lagoon is dotted with around 850 reef patches and pinnacles rising to the surface. Major cays include Amounme Point Cay, Northeast Cay, Long Cay, Middle Cay and Southwest Cay.

Ecology
Glover's harbours one of the greatest diversity of reef types in the western Caribbean.

A large spawning site for the endangered Nassau grouper (Epinephelus striatus) is located at the northeastern end of the atoll. It has been identified as one of only two viable sites remaining for the species, of nine originally known locations. In 2002, it was declared a special marine reserve, permanently closed to fishing.

Conservation

The Glover's Reef Marine Reserve was established as a national protected area in 1993 under the Fisheries Act, and is managed under the Fisheries Department of the Ministry of Agriculture and Fisheries. According to the World Wildlife Fund (WWF), it is considered one of the highest priority areas in the Mesoamerican reef system, providing nursery and feeding areas and a unique habitat for lobster, conch and finfish. In 1996, it was designated by UNESCO as one of seven protected areas that together form the Belize Barrier Reef Reserve System (a World Heritage-listed site).

The marine reserve is currently divided into four different management zones, with each zone having strict regulations defining activities that are permitted and prohibited.
General Use Zone - , 74.6%;
Conservation Zone - , 20.2%;
Wilderness Zone - , 0.8%, closed to visitors;
Seasonal Closure Zone - , 4.4%, closed to all fishing from start December to end February. Where this zone overlaps with the grouper spawning aggregation site (below), it is closed to fishing all year round.

A fifth zone has recently been created to offer greater protection to the northeast spawning aggregation site. It largely overlaps with the Seasonal Closure Zone. It is permanently closed to all fishing.

The protected area is considered to be within IUCN's category IV: a Habitat/Species Management Area, with active management targeted at conservation through management intervention.

The Wildlife Conservation Society operates the Glover's Reef Research Station on Middle Cay. It was opened in 1997 for the purpose of promoting and facilitating long-term conservation and management of the wider Belize Barrier Reef complex. Since its opening, the station has hosted more than 200 scientific and research expeditions.

References

External links
Island Expeditions on South-West Caye
Slickrock Adventures on Long Caye
Off the Wall Dive Center and Resort on Long Caye
Glover's Atoll Resort on Northeast Caye
Home page for the Glover’s Reef Marine Reserve and Research Station

World Heritage Sites in Belize
Reefs of Belize
Atolls of Belize
Belize District
Belize Rural South
Islands of Belize
Uninhabited islands of Belize
Caribbean Sea